Herbert Hadwen-Chandler (1 January 1865, Wandsworth, London – 21 August 1941, Claremont, Perth, Australia) was an Australian organist, teacher and composer of light romantic works. He was respected as a musician and well connected in Perth society.
He worked at Nicholson's Music publisher in Fremantle and Perth. He toured Australian cities as a vocalist.

Performances
Chandler played organ recitals including Handel's 'Messiah' in 1923.
He was an active member of the Perth metro Gleemen  and Perth Philharmonic society.

Personal
His only son Lance-Corporal Roy Chandler was wounded at Gallipoli and died shortly after of complications.

Works
1897 Fairy Bowers
1906 Song of the gun (verse by Frances Allitsen)
1887 Pandora March
1909 Marie Gavotte
1907 Nearing Home
1901 Summer Time (Vocal Motet)
1899 Clarion March
Make a Joyful Noise

References

Australian musicians
1865 births
1941 deaths
19th-century composers
19th-century male musicians
20th-century composers
20th-century Australian male musicians
20th-century Australian musicians
Australian composers
Australian male composers
English emigrants to colonial Australia